Louis Guédon (born 28 November 1935 in Les Sables-d'Olonne) was a member of the National Assembly of France.  He represented the Vendée department, between 1993 and 2012.  and is a member of the Union for a Popular Movement.

References

1935 births
Living people
People from Les Sables-d'Olonne
Politicians from Pays de la Loire
Rally for the Republic politicians
Union for a Popular Movement politicians
Deputies of the 10th National Assembly of the French Fifth Republic
Deputies of the 11th National Assembly of the French Fifth Republic
Deputies of the 12th National Assembly of the French Fifth Republic
Deputies of the 13th National Assembly of the French Fifth Republic